Timothy Tow Siang Hui (28 December 1920 – 20 April 2009) was a Singaporean pastor who founded the Bible-Presbyterian Church. He was also founding principal of the Far Eastern Bible College.

Personal life
Tow was educated at the Anglo-Chinese School. He was influenced first by John Sung, and later by Carl McIntire. He studied at Faith Theological Seminary and was ordained in Geneva in 1950 at a special meeting of the Philadelphia Presbytery of the Bible Presbyterian Church. Tow returned to Singapore and became pastor of the Life Church English Service at Prinsep Street Presbyterian Church. In 1955, he led a group out of the Chinese Presbyterian Synod to form the Bible-Presbyterian Church. Tow's congregation became known as Life Bible-Presbyterian Church (Life BPC). He later returned to Faith Theological Seminary and completed a Master of Sacred Theology degree.

In 2003, Tow resigned from Life BPC and founded True Life Bible-Presbyterian Church. He had been criticized for holding to the doctrine of Verbal Plenary Preservation (VPP) and, together with the other directors of the Far Eastern Bible College (FEBC), was sued in 2008 by Life BPC for teaching this doctrine in the Church's attempt to evict the College from the Gilstead Road premises which had been shared by the two institutions from the outset. However the Church failed as the Court of Appeal of Singapore, the apex court in the Singapore legal system, ruled on 26 April 2011 that (i)“the VPP doctrine is actually closely related to the VPI doctrine which both parties [i.e., FEBC and Life BPC] adhere to,” (rejecting Life BPC’s contention in [59] of the Court of Appeal Judgement that it is “an entirely different creature from the VPI doctrine");”  (ii) “the College, in adopting the VPP doctrine, has not deviated from the fundamental principles which guide and inform the work of the College right from its inception, and as expressed in the Westminster Confession;” (iii) “[i]t is not inconsistent for a Christian who believes fully in the principles contained within the Westminster Confession (and the VPI [Verbal Plenary Inspiration] doctrine) to also subscribe to the VPP doctrine;” and (iv) “[i]n the absence of anything in the Westminster Confession that deals with the status of the apographs, we [the Court] hesitate to find that the verbal plenary preservation doctrine is a deviation from the principles contained within the Westminster Confession."

Publications
 John Sung My Teacher (1985) 
 The Law of Moses and of Jesus (1986) 
 Asian Awakening (1988) 
 A Glimpse of the Life and Works of John Calvin (1993) 
 William C. Burns: Grandfather of Bible-Presbyterians (1994) 
 Pattern for Church Growth and Missions (1996) 
 An Abridgement of Calvin's Institutes of the Christian Religion Book I-IV (1997) 
 A Theology for Every Christian Book I: Knowing God and His Word (1998) co-authored with Jeffrey Khoo 
 Theology for Every Christian: A Systematic Theology in the Reformed and Premillennial Tradition of J Oliver Buswell (2007) co-authored with Jeffrey Khoo

Further reading
Born Again in the Singapore Pentecost (1993) 
The Singapore B-P Church Story (1995) 
The Story of My Bible-Presbyterian Faith (1999) 
Son of A Mother’s Vow (2001) (Autobiography)

References

1920 births
2009 deaths
Singaporean Presbyterians
Singaporean Christian clergy
Anglo-Chinese School alumni
Faith Theological Seminary alumni
University and college founders
Seminary presidents
Presidents of Calvinist and Reformed seminaries
20th-century Calvinist and Reformed theologians
21st-century Calvinist and Reformed theologians
Christian hymnwriters
Calvinist and Reformed hymnwriters
Christian fundamentalism